Ligota Górna  (German Ober Ellguth) is a village in the administrative district of Gmina Kluczbork, within Kluczbork County, Opole Voivodeship, in south-western Poland.

See also
Holy Cross Church, Ligota Górna

References

Villages in Kluczbork County